The Farther Shore is the second book of two of the "Homecoming" series. It takes place directly after the show's final episode, "Endgame". This article is about a current Star Trek: Voyager relaunch novel.

Plot summary 
There is a Borg conspiracy going on Earth, and suddenly people begin to transform into Borg drones. Now Captain Janeway and her crew must save Earth.

External links

2003 American novels
American science fiction novels
Novels based on Star Trek: Voyager